Abemama (Apamama) is an atoll, one of the Gilberts group in Kiribati, and is located  southeast of Tarawa and just north of the Equator. The islets surround a deep lagoon. The eastern part of the atoll of Abemama is linked together by causeways making automobile traffic possible between the different islets. The outlying islands of Abatiku and Biike are situated on the southwestern side of the atoll.

The village of Kariatebike serves as the government center for the atoll which includes an administration building, the police station and a hospital.

Abemama was formerly known as Roger Simpson Island, Dundas Island, Hopper Island, or Simpson Island.

Geography 

The island has 3 main islets; the largest and main islet has 11 villages and is home to most of the population. Abatiku, an islet located at the north-western reef, and Biike just south of it, have much smaller populations.

The island is blessed with a massive lagoon area and an abundance of lagoon fish, shellfish, and worms. There are also some seaweed farms.
Causeways were constructed to link all villages on the main islet making transportation easy. The island resembles an incomplete “G” letter, with two reef passages; one is located in between Abatiku and Tabiang village at the north-western end. The other is between Biike and Kenna, the latter being the southernmost end of the main islet. The island is surrounded with an exposed reef at the windward side and submerged reef at the leeward side where Biike and Abatiku are situated. Most of the important food crops in Kiribati such as coconut, giant taro, pandanus and breadfruit grow well in Abemama.

Villages

History 

Happened on by Captain Charles Bishop in 1799, he referred to Abemama on the map he created as Roger Simpson Island, after one of his friends.

The island was surveyed in 1841 by the US Exploring Expedition.

In the mid to late 19th Century, Abemama was ruled by a single paramount chief. This contrasts with the Northern Gilbert Islands where groups of families or kainga would have their own separate leaders, and the Southern Gilberts (from Nonouti southwards) where the old men or unimwane collectively would meet in the maneaba to govern.  Some European sources describe the chiefly family of Abemama as "the Gilbert Islands ruling family" but local sources recognise that the unimwane wield much of the power even on Abemama, and governing the whole of the Gilbert Islands as a single unit is a logistical challenge even in modern times.

Nonetheless the chiefly family of Abemama has a long history of providing overall leadership, and during the time of Tem Binoka ruled over Kuria and Aranuka also.  The chiefly family of Abemama remains highly regarded and respected to this day.

Abemama Post Office opened around 1910.

Robert Louis Stevenson, Fanny Vandegrift Stevenson and her son Lloyd Osbourne spent 2 months on Abemama in 1889. Near Tabontebike is the tomb of tyrant-chief Tem Binoka, who was immortalized by Stevenson in his account of the 1889 voyage of the Equator published as In the South Seas Robert Louis Stevenson, Fanny Vandegrift Stevenson and Lloyd Osbourne returned to Abemama in July 1890 during their cruise on the trading steamer the Janet Nicoll.

World War II
Japan occupied the Gilberts on 9 December 1941.

On 21 November 1943, the American submarine  landed a company of 78 U.S. Marine Corps Amphibious Reconnaissance Scouts with Australian Army Lt George Hand formerly of the Ocean Island Defence Force acting as an interpreter  to seize the island. They defeated the Japanese garrison with fire support from Nautilus. On the morning of 25 November, a native reported to the Marines that the remaining Japanese committed suicide. The US Navy built Naval Base Abemama on the island and departed in the fall of 1944. <ref>p.30 Rottman, Gordon L. US Special Warfare Units in the Pacific Theatre 1941-1945 Ospery Publishing 2005</ref>

 Visiting Abemama 
Abemama is an island of beautiful beaches with a crystal clear blue lagoon. In Abemama, you still can find physical evidence of American and Japanese WWII relics, cultural shrines and sites/monuments relating to their traditional spirits and famous King Binoka. Abemama is close enough to the capital of South Tarawa for a weekend getaway, and is often visited by cruising yachts due to its very sheltered lagoon. The lagoon is abundant in bonefish, a popular species with sport anglers.

Abemama Atoll Airport is located on the north end of Abemama near the village of Tabiang. It has regular connections with the international airport in Tarawa twice weekly, on Wednesday and Sunday.

There are three guest houses on Abemama; the Island Council guest house, Chevalier College guest house, and one private lodge.

Education
The island has the following Christian senior high schools:
 Chevalier School
 Kauma Adventist High School - Also has junior high school

King George V School, a secondary school for boys which opened in Bairiki in 1922, moved to Abemama, and then to Bikenibeu in 1953.

 References 

External links

Encyclopædia Britannica, Abemama Atoll
Marines take Abemama http://todayshistorylesson.wordpress.com/2008/11/25/marines-take-apamama-with-just-26-shots/
Exhibit: The Alfred Agate Collection: The United States Exploring Expedition, 1838-1842 from the Navy Art Gallery
 Stevenson, Robert L. (1896), In the South Seas''

Gilbert Islands
Atolls of Kiribati